College of St. John–Roxas (CSJ-R De La Salle), also known simply as St. John, is private college run under the supervision of the De La Salle Brothers, and now a member of the Association of Lasallian Affiliated Schools (ALAS) under the De La Salle Philippines located in Roxas City, Philippines. It has been known as University of St. La Salle – Affiliate College and La Salle Affiliate College. In June 2000, the school managed the high school department of Our Lady of Mount Carmel Learning Center (Mount Carmel La Salle).

History

Supervised by University of St. La Salle-Bacolod

In the late 1990s, there was a growing demand for quality education in Capiz. It has been observed that many graduates in the local high schools go to big cities like Manila, Cebu, Bacolod and Iloilo to pursue college education. With this, concerned Capizeños in the persons of Mrs. Judy Roxas (mother of Mar Roxas), Atty. Antonio Ortiz, Dr. Abundio Balgos and Engr. Antonio Balgos met Br. Rolando Dizon FSC, then president of the  University of St. La Salle in Bacolod City and presented the idea of putting up a La Salle school in Roxas City. University of St. La Salle-Bacolod then supervised Our Lady of Mount Carmel Learning Center (also known as Mount Carmel La Salle), the first La Salle supervised school in Roxas City under Mrs. Norma Tagle of USLS-Bacolod. In June 1999, the University of St. La Salle – Affiliate College (USLS-AC) under the supervision of the University of St. La Salle in Bacolod City opened its doors to the youth of Capiz and the neighboring provinces in Panay Island. The first school building housed 10 classrooms, a science lab, a computer lab, a clinic, a prayer room, a library and administrative offices mostly located in the ground floor. The first school head and dean of the college was Dr. Teresita Atotubo, formerly the Dean of the College of Arts and Sciences at USLS- Bacolod. Br. Rolando Dizon FSC became its first President while Mrs. Judy Roxas was chosen as the first chair of the Board of Trustees (BoT). The school initially offered four academic programs: Bachelor of Science in Accountancy, Bachelor of Science in commerce with majors in Management Accounting, Business Management, Management Information Systems and Marketing, Bachelor of Science in psychology, and Bachelor of Science in biology. In that same school year, the school acquired a Multi-cab service car through the donation of De La Salle-College of St. Benilde.

Mt. Carmel La Salle Turn Over and Merger

In June 2000, Mount Carmel La Salle, also a University of St. La Salle-supervised school in Roxas City, decided to turn over the management of its high school to USLS-AC due to the growing number of students and limited space of its school. Mount Carmel La Salle (OLMCLC) decided to retain and maintain its Pre-School and Grade School. The first principal of the high school department was Mrs. Marilyn Centillo. Mrs. Floramae Billanes was appointed principal effective SY 2001–2002. Also, USLS-AC started its application for the BS Nursing program. Consequently, DepEd granted approval for the opening of Pre – School and Grade 1 effective SY 2002–2003. Infrastructure improvements were the construction of basketball court, guard house, canteen, high school Home Economics room, and perimeter fence at the back of the main building.

In 2013, Our Lady of Mt. Carmel Learning Center merged with the School and officially closed its campus in Kalipayan Rd., Punta Tabuc.

Name changed to La Salle Affiliate College

At the start of SY 2002–2003, the name of the school was changed to La Salle Affiliate College. It was in that significant school year that the Preparatory School and Grade 1 were opened also under the management of Mrs. Billanes. The three academic programs in the college level were granted government recognition. The Commission on Higher Education (CHED) granted Government Permit to LSAC to operate the first year level of BS Nursing effective SY 2003–2004. Mrs. Judy Roxas visited LSAC to turn-over the proceeds of a benefit concert of Ogie Alcasid, Randy Santiago and Zsa Zsa Padilla that was used in the construction of the Covered court roof.

Supervised by De La Salle University-Manila

In May 2003, Dr. Rosemarie Montañano (from De La Salle University) became the Executive Vice-president and Dean of the College of Arts and Sciences of LSAC and it was followed by the appointment of Atty. Antonio Ortiz as President of the school on July 26, 2003, since the post was vacated by Br. Rolando Dizon, FSC who was given the Chairmanship of the CHED. The supervision of the school was transferred to  De La Salle University-Manila and Br. Armin Luistro FSC became the Chairman of its Board Of Trustees (BOT) (now DepEd Secretary). The BS Nursing Program was opened and Mrs. Ma. Ruby Fullon was appointed Dean. Ms. Rowena Banes became the Principal of the Integrated School succeeding Mrs. Billanes. For the first time LSAC submitted itself for Lasallian Schools Supervision Office (LASSO) Assessment Level 1. Also, in this school year, the second floor of the Pre-school building was completed.

In June 2004, Mrs. E. Regina V. Dabao was appointed principal of the pre-school, grade school and high school. Infrastructure projects came to rise with the construction of the stage, and two classrooms of the grade school. It was in this school year that Dr. Allyn Ricafuente was appointed dean of the College of Nursing.

Name changed to College of St. John-Roxas

In April 2005, the BoT upon the advice of Lasallian Schools Supervision Office (LASSO) decided to change the name of the school into College of St. John - Roxas. Br. Armin Luistro FSC (now DepEd Secreatary) came to Roxas to strengthen the decision. The administration decided to offer another program, the AB English. Mr. Mark Nel Venus as its chair. In 2006, the CSJ-R was assessed Level 1 by the Lasallian Schools Supervision Office (LASSO).

For the school year 2006–2007, the College of Nursing had a new Dean in the person of Mr. Gilmore Solidum. The high school building was constructed and the Grade School building was completed. The first batch of BS Nursing graduated in April 2007.

In June 2007, Dr. Rosemarie Montañano ended her term as EVP of CSJ-R. Dr. Emma A. Encarnacion (former principal of La Salle Green Hills and presently the Vice President of Mercury Drug Inc.) became the Chancellor and Dean of the College of Arts and Sciences of CSJ-R. She was appointed by the BoT as chief executive officer (CEO) and Chief Operating Officer (COO) of the school. The transition paved the way to improving the school's operation and instruction based on the Lasallian tradition and orientation. Some of her initial projects were the repainting and improvement of the buildings and school grounds; review of the vision-mission, core values and the formulation of the graduate attributes; review and revision of the curricula from Basic Education Unit (BEU) to College; and the Open House in the Basic Education Unit. In the college level, Mrs. Cora Diaz was appointed Dean of the College of Nursing by Dr. Encarnacion effective July 2007. The BSN pioneer batch took the December 2007 Nursing Licensure Exam garnering 68.75% against the national passing percentage of 43.3%. Also, the April 2007 batch of BS Accountancy got 66.67% against the national passing percentage of 40%, both the highest in Capiz.

Dr. Encarnacion together with the BoT reviewed and revised the organizational chart. For the first time in April 2008, there was an appointed dean other than the school head for the College of Arts, Sciences and Business (CASB) in the person of Dr. Roxanne Ibañez-Edrosolano. The other new appointees are Ms. Jovi Albor as Finance Services Unit (FSU) Head, Mr. Mark Nel Venus as Assistant Dean for Students Affairs, Ms. Betty Miranda as Clinical Coordinator, Ms. Vanessa Rasco as Controller, Ms. Eimee Potato as Academic Support Services Office (ASSO) Director, Ms. Agatha Sheila Matutina as Office of Administrative Services (OAS) Director and Mr. Nestor Paul Pingil as Assistant Principal for Academic Affairs.

In May 2009, Dr. Gloria S. Chavez (former Dean of Business Administration of DLSU-D) was appointed by the BOT as President-Chancellor and was formally installed on July 8, 2009, by Br. Armin A. Luistro FSC, Chairman of the BOT and President of De La Salle University-Manila and President and chief executive officer of De La Salle Philippines, (now Deped Secretary). Prior to Dr. Chavez' appointment, she was an educator, administrator, researcher, and has rendered meritorious service in other La Salle schools. In 2010, Nursing Board exam, the College of Nursing got a 100% passing rate for its first takers and in CPA Board exam, the Accountancy department got 60% passing rate, the highest in the province of Capiz.

K-12 years (2012-present)

In 2012, the school graduated from the supervision of the Lasallian Schools Supervision Office and has installed in its campus the marker of Excellence after having assessed Level II-the highest assessment given to a De La Salle supervised school. Br. Narciso S. Erguiza (President of DLSU, President of CEAP) became its new chairman of the Board of Trustees as Br. Armin A. Luistro FSC accepted the post as DepEd Secretary.

In 2013, the Grade school and high school batches topped the National Achievement Test (NAT) among the Private schools in Roxas City and got the highest rating in critical thinking in the Roxas City Division.

In April 2014, the College of St. John–Roxas became a member of the Association of Lasallian Affiliated Schools and at the same time applied to De La Salle Philippines to be a District School.

In May 2014, Ms. Evita Regina Viterbo Dabao was appointed as president-chancellor. Mr. Mark Nel R. Venus and Joey D. Arroyo were appointed principals of high school and grade school respectively. Ms. Marie Fe Dela Cruz was appointed dean of the College of Arts, Sciences, Business and Teacher Education and Mr. Xerxes Malaga as dean of the College of Nursing. Ms. Pamela Hazel Bediones, CPA was appointed head of finance. In the same year, the construction of an additional building, which will be later known as the "senior high school building" started.

The school has won several awards regionally and nationally. It has won twice the collegiate debate competitions sponsored by Bombo Radyo. It has received various awards in the MILO Twin Tournament including the Sportsmanship Award in the Regional Tournament. In February 2015, its high school debating team won the championship among public and private schools in Capiz and Roxas City. Mr. Mark Nel R. Venus was the coach of the Debating team and has been instrumental in the development of debate in the institution.

In October 2015, the Department of Education has given the school a government permit to offer senior high school with the following strands: Science, Technology, Engineering Mathematics (STEM), Accountancy, Business and Management (ABM) and General Academic (GA). It has also advanced the preparation of senior high school program by linking to Health Centrum, a state-of-the-art hospital and the Sacred Heart of Jesus Prime Holdings Inc and various industries to enrich its curricular offerings.

Dela Cruz resigned from her post on December 14, 2015. Although separate, the two colleges (CASBTE and CN) were merged as one but remained separate in January 2016. Mr. Xerxes Malaga, RN, the CN dean, became the dean of both departments.

In 2016, the school celebrated its 17th Foundation Day Celebration.

In June 2017, a series of transition and new appointments paved the way for better service. A new organizational chart was created and a more vibrant strategic plan directed school's operations and system. Mr. Christopher Obispado was appointed as vice chancellor for administration, Mr. Joey Arroyo as vice chancellor for academics and Mr. Xerxes Malaga as vice chancellor for PEARL. In October 2017, Ms. Angeline Marcelino was appointed as the new principal of the Basic Education Unit.

CSJ-R was the first school to successfully integrate the robotics program in their curriculum in the Province of Capiz. Winning the Internet of Things Excellence Award given by ACER Philippines and DOST-SEI in the 2nd Imake.Wemake national innovation competition besting 64 schools and 16 finalist nationwide. It is also the only private basic education in the province that has networked with SEAMEO. It is also a recipient of The Institutional Development and Innovation Grants (IDIG) which is awarded to higher education institutions (HEIs) to fund initiatives that strengthen their qualifications and capacity to respond and remain relevant to local, regional, national, and global priorities. It has been granted by CHED to offer trimester program which will allow students to graduate college in just three years.

Courses offered

These are the courses offered in CSJ-R. In 2012, the school offered a new degree course which is BS Real Estate Management. College of St. John Roxas became the first school in Capiz to offer this course.

 BS Psychology
 BS Accountancy
 BS Nursing
 BS Business Administration
 BS Education, Secondary Department
 BS Real Estate Management (new course)

SENIOR HIGH SCHOOL OFFERINGS: (With Government Permit SHS 105, s.o. 2016)

STEM (Science, Technology, Engineering, Mathematics)
ABM (Accountancy, Business and Management)
GAS (General Academic Strand)

Industry Linkages:
Association of Lasallian Affiliated Schools (ALAS)-Student Development, Exposure, Faculty Development, Field Trip, Exchange program, Benchmarking, Research
La Salle Green Hills-student Development, Exposure, FacultyDevelopment, Field Trip, Exchange program, Benchmarking, availment of seminars and workshops, simulation, Research
 De La Salle University-Faculty Development, Exchange programs, research
 The Health Centrum: Exposure, Immersion, Input to curriculum, research, OJT
 Sacred Heart of Jesus Prime Holdings, Inc-Exposure, Immersion, Input to curriculum, research, OJT
BDO-Exposure, input to curriculum
 Chambers of Commerce-Research, inputs to curriculum
 Business People Inc-Exposure, Immersion, Input to curriculum, research, OJT

External links
 College of St. John - Roxas
 Partial list of La Salle schools & educational institutions throughout the archipelago
 De La Salle Supervised Schools
 University of St. La Salle Supervised Schools
 La Salle Schools in Roxas City

References 

Universities and colleges in Capiz
Catholic universities and colleges in the Philippines
Education in Roxas, Capiz
Educational institutions established in 1999
1999 establishments in the Philippines